Peter Joseph Holohan (born July 25, 1959 in Albany, New York) is a former professional American football player.

Career

College career 
Holohan was recruited to Notre Dame out of Liverpool High School (New York) as a quarterback. He also played basketball and was recruited by Syracuse coach Jim Boeheim.

When he arrived on campus at Notre Dame, Holohan was set to compete against a group of 11 other quarterbacks that included Joe Montana. He eventually changed positions and was a member of Notre Dame's 1977 national title-winning team.

Professional career 
A 6'4", 232-lb. tight end, Holohan was selected by the San Diego Chargers in the seventh round of the 1981 NFL Draft. He played for twelve NFL seasons from 1981 to 1992 for the Chargers, the Los Angeles Rams, the Kansas City Chiefs and the Cleveland Browns.

Awards and recognition 
Holohan is a member of the Greater Syracuse Hall of Fame.

Personal life 
Holohan's father served in World War II. He is married with two daughters.

References 

1959 births
Living people
Sportspeople from Albany, New York
American football tight ends
Notre Dame Fighting Irish football players
San Diego Chargers players
Los Angeles Rams players
Kansas City Chiefs players
Cleveland Browns players
Ed Block Courage Award recipients
Liverpool High School alumni